"So Fine" is the title of the fifth track from A New World Record by Electric Light Orchestra.

Recorded in 1976 at Musicland Studios in Munich, Germany, this track is peppy and upbeat, contrasting with "Mission (A World Record)", the previous track. It is a typical example of ELO's (at the time) cutting-edge use of technology and recording techniques, which would become the conventional sound of pop music within 10 years.

The middle section contains African drums and electronic percussion created by a then state of the art Moog processor, and continues with rising intensity. More and more instruments join in, until the vocal again takes over. As it fades out, it segues into the Middle Eastern-inspired violin of "Livin' Thing".

Production and composition
According to ELO drummer Bev Bevan (regarding the Moog processor):
 Uh, yeah, I used it on one track on the album, So Fine. It really - It's quite a new item, really. It's made by the Moog people. It's an electronic - It's a drum itself and it's electronic. You plug it through the keyboard setup into the Moog itself. And according to what setting you put on the Moog, you can get a sound accordingly on the drum. And, uh, it's very new. Very innovative."
Bev Bevan (1976 - Rock Around The World radio show interview)

Composer Jeff Lynne described writing the song in a 1990 radio interview with Roger Scott:
"So Fine's a bouncy little (number). I really don't know much about it. It's just that I wrote it and sang the thing. And um- I suppose it was along the lines of a - like an American, trying to sound like an American style. Maybe like The Doobie Brothers or something, y'know, trying to sound a bit like an American group with harmonies. I wasn't trying to copy 'em, but it was... it was sort of bouncy American style with a wobbly bit on the top." Jeff Lynne (August 21, 1990 - Classic Albums radio interview by Roger Scott)

Regarding the dropping end of So Fine to segue into the next song on the LP, Livin' Thing:
"(It) was getting the two track and - and just basically switching it off, y'know, the motors off. So that it went '(SQUEAL)' and when it got to the - to the key that, uh, Livin' Thing was in, we cut it there and just but it straight on. So as it reached C, what Livin' Thing was in. So it went down from like - maybe F sharp all the way down to C, y'know, the tape went. Somewhere like that. I can't remember the exact keys. I know it was quite a long drop."
Jeff Lynne (August 21, 1990 - Classic Albums radio interview by Roger Scott)

In the book about ELO, Unexpected Messages, the authors expounded:
"The end of the song So Fine fades into Livin' Thing. This was created by unplugging the tape machine and when it got to the key 'A' (which starts off Livin' Thing) Jeff cut it."
Patrik Guttenbacher, Marc Haines, & Alexander von Petersdorff (1996 Unexpected Messages)

However, both of the last two quotes are inaccurate about the exact keys, as the former suggests. The drop starts on an A chord and ends on a C chord, the former being the subdominant chord in the key of E major, and the latter being the new tonic.

References

Electric Light Orchestra songs
Song recordings produced by Jeff Lynne
1976 songs
Songs written by Jeff Lynne